Davies Top is a conspicuous isolated peak  high on the east side of Wakefield Highland, near the head of Lurabee Glacier in northern Palmer Land. It was photographed from the air by the Ronne Antarctic Research Expedition on December 22, 1947, and surveyed by the Falkland Islands Dependencies Survey (FIDS) in November 1960. It was named by the UK Antarctic Place-Names Committee after Antony G. Davies of FIDS, who was Medical Officer at Horseshoe Island and Stonington Island, 1960.

References
 

Mountains of Palmer Land